Berlin is in Germany is a 2001 German drama film directed by Hannes Stöhr. Hannes Stöhr's first cinema feature, the film won the Panorama Audience award at the International Berlin Filmfestival 2001, the German critics association award, the Studio Hamburg award, and many others.

Cast

References

External links
 

2001 films
2001 drama films
German drama films
2000s German films